Monsieur Papa is a 2011 French film directed by Kad Merad and starring Michèle Laroque and Kad Merad.

Plot
Marius Vallois is 12 years old and needs a father. Marie Vallois has a 12-year-old son, heavy work responsibilities, a lover to calm, a position to fill, an adored sister and a complicated cousin, but no father for Marius. Robert Pique has a steam iron, is always late with the laundry, a Chinese fantasy, a neighbor who he protects and is looking for a job. Monsieur Papa is a story of a curious link which weaves between these 3 characters. A link which will give them difficulty and attachment for life.

Cast 
 Michèle Laroque as Marie Vallois
 Kad Merad as Robert Pique
 Gaspard Meier-Chaurand as Marius
 Judith El Zein as Sonia
 Vincent Perez as Jean-Laurent
 Myriam Boyer as Suzy Benchetrit
 Florence Maury as Chloé
 Emmanuel Patron as Marie's friend
 Clovis Cornillac as Vidal
 Bernard Le Coq as Mr Forlani
 Olivier Baroux as Richard
 Jacques Balutin as caretaker
 Jacques Herlin as the oldtimer in an armchair

References

External links
 

2011 comedy films
2011 films
French comedy films
2010s French-language films
Films directed by Kad Merad
2010s French films